The girls' 6 km sprint biathlon competition at the 2020 Winter Youth Olympics was held on 14 January at the Les Tuffes Nordic Centre.

Results
The race was started at 13:30.

References

Girls' sprint